King Racing was a racing team which fielded cars in the NASCAR Winston Cup Series as well as in CART and the Indianapolis 500. The team was owned by NHRA drag racing driver Kenny Bernstein.

NASCAR
For its entire run in NASCAR’s top series, King Racing fielded a car numbered 26 and carrying sponsorship from Quaker State Motor Oil. Bernstein fielded Buick Regals until General Motors pulled the brand from NASCAR following the 1991 season; after that, the team competed with Ford Thunderbirds. 

King’s first season was 1986 with the 26 being driven by Joe Ruttman with Larry McReynolds, who had begun working in the sport nearly ten years earlier, as crew chief. In 1987 Ruttman was replaced with Morgan Shepherd, and for 1988 Ricky Rudd joined the team. 

The team won its first Cup Series race in 1988 with Rudd at The Budweiser at the Glen. Rudd also won the Banquet Frozen Foods 300 at Sears Point Raceway in 1989 on his way to an eighth place points finish. 

Rudd left King Racing to take over for Geoff Bodine at Hendrick Motorsports following the 1989 season, and for 1990 Geoff’s brother Brett Bodine took over the 26. He won the First Union 400 at North Wilkesboro, which proved to be the team’s final victory.

Partway through the 1991 season, Robert Yates Racing signed McReynolds away from the 26 to replace Jake Elder as the crew chief to Davey Allison. Bodine, meanwhile, recorded six top tens, including two top five finishes at Martinsville, on his way to a 19th place finish in the points. 

Bodine would stay on with King for three more seasons, competing in a total of 158 races for the team. 1992 saw him finish 15th in the standings with thirteen top ten finishes and two top fives. He recorded nine top tens and three top fives, finishing 20th despite missing the fall race at Dover due to injury. Then, in 1994, Bodine managed a second place finish in the inaugural Brickyard 400, scoring his last career top five finish. He followed this up with two more top tens, the last at Charlotte in the fall, and finished 19th in points. 

In 1995, Bodine left to join Junior Johnson & Associates as the replacement for Bill Elliott following Elliott's decision to become an owner-driver (something Bodine would do a year later), and Steve Kinser was signed away from the World of Outlaws sprint car series to take over. The multiple time world champion had trouble adjusting to the world of stock car racing, and after he finished 40th or worse three times in five starts and failed to qualify for two other races, Kinser was released from the team. Hut Stricklin was brought in to finish the season and recorded two top five finishes and five total top tens. 

After a 34th place finish in points, Bernstein sold his team to Ricky Rudd at the end of 1995 and returned to focusing strictly on drag racing.

Indy cars

1988
King Racing made their debut during the 1988 season, fielding the No. 15 and 17 Mac Tools Lola T8700-Buick V6 at the Indianapolis 500 with Jim Crawford in No. 15 and Johnny Rutherford in No. 17. Both qualified mid-pack. Crawford led for eight laps (the only laps not led by a Team Penske driver). Crawford was running in second place late in the race. Crawford then ran too low on the track, getting into the grass, and dropped to 6th place during a pit stop to change the damaged tire.

1989–1991
For the 1989 season, the team fielded Crawford again in the No. 15 Mac Tools Lola T8700-Buick V6 at the Indianapolis 500 and qualified in 4th place. Crawford suffered a practice crash. The car was repaired in time to race. Crawford retired with mechanical problems. King Racing did not compete in 1990. They made a return during the 1991 season with Crawford driving the No. 26 Quaker State Lola T9100-Buick V6 and would qualify in 8th place. Crawford would retire with mechanical problems.

1992
For 1992 season King Racing would compete in their first race besides the Indianapolis 500 when Roberto Guerrero drove the No. 36 Quaker State Lola T9100-Buick V6 at the Toyota Grand Prix of Long Beach on the streets of Long Beach; he was however off the pace due to CART ruling not giving V6 engines as much boost. However at the Indianapolis 500 King Racing ran a pair of Quaker State Lola T9200-Buick V6 with Guerrero in No. 36 and Crawford in No. 26. The USAC (who sanctioned the Indianapolis 500) regulations for V6 engines gave them more boost. As a result, Guerrero would qualify on the pole position setting new one-lap and 4-lap records with a 4-lap average of 232 mph and one lap at 233 mph. Crawford was also fast but had mechanical problems on pole day and recovered to qualify. Guerrero would spin out during the parade lap and would fail to start as a result. Crawford was running in the top 10 when he spun into the wall, collecting Rick Mears. Mears' teammate Emerson Fittipaldi also spun and crashed on the same lap.

1993
For 1993 King Racing would expand to a full-time team with Guerrero driving the No. 40 Budweiser King Lola T9300-Ilmor-Chevrolet Indy V8. Jim Crawford would drive No. 80 and Al Unser Sr. in No. 60. At the Indianapolis 500, Guerrero was involved in a crash with Jeff Andretti. Unser led early on but dropped to 13th. Crawford would spin out early on and would not recover. Guerrero would get a best finish of 4th at the New England 200 at New Hampshire Motor Speedway but was replaced by Eddie Cheever for the last few races of the season. Guerrero would finish 14th in points.

1994
For 1994 Scott Goodyear would drive the No. 40 Budweiser King Lola T9400-Ford-Cosworth XB. At the Indianapolis 500 the team hired Davy Jones to drive a spare car numbered 40T (it would be changed to 60 on race day). Goodyear would fail to qualify while Jones would qualify. So Goodyear would replace Jones on race day but retired with mechanical problems early on. Goodyear gave King Racing their only CART win when he drove to victory at the Marlboro 500 at Michigan International Speedway. Goodyear finished 12th in points (King Racing's highest CART position in points). 

The 1994 season was the last in CART for King Racing, as Bernstein opted to shut the team down.

Driver history

CART IndyCar
  Jim Crawford (1988–1989, 1991–1993)
  Johnny Rutherford (1988)
  Geoff Brabham (1991)
  Roberto Guerrero (1991–1993)
  Willy T. Ribbs (1991)
  Eddie Cheever (1993)
  Al Unser (1993)
  Scott Goodyear (1994)
  Andrea Montermini (1994)

NASCAR
  Joe Ruttman (1986)
  Morgan Shepherd (1987)
  Ricky Rudd (1988–1989)
  Brett Bodine (1990–1994)
  Dick Trickle (1993; injury replacement at Dover)
  Steve Kinser (1995, replaced after North Wilkesboro)
  Hut Stricklin (1995)

Racing results

Complete CART Indy Car World Series results 
(key)

IndyCar win

Complete NASCAR Winston Cup Series results

External links
Kenny Bernstein Website
NASCAR Stats for Kenny Bernstein at everythingstockcar.com

1986 establishments in the United States
1995 disestablishments in the United States
Defunct NASCAR teams
American auto racing teams
Champ Car teams
Auto racing teams established in 1986
Auto racing teams disestablished in 1995